The 1988 New York Jets season was the 29th season for the team and the 19th in the National Football League. It began with the team trying to improve upon its 6–9 record from 1987 under head coach Joe Walton. The Jets finished the season with a record of 8–7–1. Although for the second straight year they failed to qualify for the playoffs, they would play the spoiler, as a victory over their cross-town rival New York Giants in Week 16 kept the Giants out of the playoffs due to a series of tiebreakers. For the third time in his career, Ken O'Brien had the lowest rate of interceptions among quarterbacks. He had 7 interceptions in 424 passing attempts.

The Jets endured a major distraction when Mark Gastineau, the team's main pass rusher who appeared to be experiencing a career-renaissance, abruptly retired in midseason to tend to ailing actress Brigitte Nielsen.

Offseason

Draft

Personnel

Staff

Roster

Starters

Regular season

Schedule

Game summaries

Week 1

Week 2

Week 3

Week 4

Week 5

Week 6

Week 7

Week 8

Week 9

Week 10

Week 11

Week 12

Week 13

Week 14

Week 15

Week 16

Standings

External links 
 1988 New York Jets at Pro-Football-Reference.com

References 

New York Jets seasons
New York Jets
New York Jets season
20th century in East Rutherford, New Jersey
Meadowlands Sports Complex